The St. Cloud Norsemen is a Tier II junior ice hockey team in the North American Hockey League's (NAHL) Central Division. The Norsemen play out of the St. Cloud Municipal Athletic Complex in St. Cloud, Minnesota. The team consists of players ranging in age from 16–20 years old who relocate from anywhere in the United States, with a limited number of international players. The team plays a 60-game schedule from September to March.

The team began in the 2003–04 season as the Minnesota Blizzard based in Alexandria, Minnesota. In 2006, the team was re-branded as the Alexandria Blizzard  and played at the Runestone Community Center. From 2012 to 2019 , the organization played at the Larson Ice Center in Brookings, South Dakota, as the Brookings Blizzard.

On May 6, 2020, the Blizzard announced their rebrand to Norsemen.

Season-by-season records

College commitments 

About one third of the NAHL roster end up committing to an NCAA school.  Below are Brookings Blizzard players that have made NCAA Division I commitments.

References

External links 
Official site

North American Hockey League teams
Ice hockey teams in Minnesota
2003 establishments in Minnesota
Ice hockey clubs established in 2003
Sports in St. Cloud, Minnesota